Litex is a Bulgarian professional association football club based in Lovech, which currently competes in the Second League. The club was founded in 1921 as Hisarya Sports Club.

The club's home ground is the Gradski Stadion, which has a capacity of 8,100 seats, electric floodlights and permission to stage European matches. As one of the successful Bulgarian clubs outside the capital Sofia, Litex have won the domestic championship four times and the Bulgarian Cup on four occasions. Together with CSKA Sofia and Levski Sofia, Litex was also the third football club to represent the country regularly in the European Club Association.

History

1921–1996

The club was founded in 1921 as Hisarya and began playing league football two years later, in 1923. Over the years, the club has changed its name several times. From 1957 it was named Karpachev, before becoming Osam in 1979. Under that name the club played constantly in the B Group, the second division of Bulgarian football and was near to promotion several times. A notable player during this period was Plamen Linkov, who broke the club's appearance record, playing 575 matches and scoring 167 goals respectively.

In 1990, after Bulgaria's transition to market economy, privately owned company LEX became the main sponsor of the club. During the same year, the new owners changed the name of the football club to LEX. The 1993–94 B Group proved to be impressive for the club, as the team finished first in the second division and qualified for the A Group, a notable milestone never done before in the club's history. LEX's debut season in the A Group was also noteworthy, as the team ranked 11th at the end of the season. The next season however proved to be unsuccessful and the club, renamed Lovech, was relegated to the B Group.

Grisha Ganchev ownership (1996–2016)
In June 1996, the club was purchased by Grisha Ganchev, petrol businessman and a citizen of Lovech, and it was renamed to Litex. The takeover was immediately followed by a flurry of bids for high-profile players. Ferario Spasov was named as the new Litex coach. He led the club back to the A Group at their first attempt. During the 1996–97 season Litex also reached the quarter-finals of the Bulgarian Cup and the final of the Bulgarian League Cup, which was lost after a penalty shoot-out.

In 1997, Litex was promoted for the second time to the top division and immediately became Bulgarian champions, finishing the season 5 points ahead of the second-placed Levski Sofia, unprecedented in the Bulgarian football history. The striker of the team Dimcho Belyakov also became top goalscorer with his 21 goals contributed during the season. In addition, midfielder Stoycho Stoilov received the Best Player of the League award. In the club's first appearance in European club competition, Litex eliminated Swedish club Halmstads BK 4–3 on aggregate, reaching the second qualifying round, where it was knocked out by Spartak Moscow.

A year later Litex successfully defended their league title, losing only two league games during the course of the season. They became the first provincial club to win back-to-back league titles since the 1920s. During their campaign, Litex also inflicted the biggest defeat in CSKA Sofia's history, an 8-0 thrashing at the Lovech Stadium.

During the first decade of the 21st century, Litex won the Bulgarian Cup four times—in 2001 after defeating Velbazhd Kyustendil 1–0 in extra time, in 2004 against CSKA after a penalty shoot-out, in 2008 after a 1–0 win over Cherno More Varna, and in 2009, after a 3–0 thrashing over Pirin Blagoevgrad. In early August 2007, Litex signed a three-year sponsorship and advertising contract with Bulgarian mobile operator GLOBUL and started the 2007–08 season with the logo of the mobile service i-mode on the team's kits. In December 2007, Litex became the first Bulgarian club to have a branded mobile phone game, Litex Football. Before the start of the 2008–09 season, Litex lost the Bulgarian Supercup final with 0-1 from CSKA Sofia after a goal from Kiril Kotev in the 65th minute. A season later, Litex again failed to win the Bulgarian Supercup final, this time against domestic title holders Levski Sofia.

In 2009–10, Litex became champions of Bulgaria for the third time in their history, finishing the season with 12 points advantage over the runners-up CSKA Sofia. On 12 August 2010, Litex defeated Beroe 2–1 to finally secure the Bulgarian Supercup, the last remaining domestic trophy never won before by the club. In 2010–11 Litex retained their fourth league title, securing the championship after a 3–1 away win against Lokomotiv Sofia on 21 May 2011.

Expulsion and new beginning (2015–present)
In the summer of 2015, Grisha Ganchev stepped down from his position as an owner, only to reallocate his main investments to Bulgarian football club CSKA Sofia, which was struggling financially with unpaid debts during the time. As a result, his son Danail took over at Litex, with previous shareholder, Bulgarian joint stock company Sport 96, remaining as a subsidiary of Litex Commerce JSC.

On 16 December 2015, the Bulgarian Football Union expelled Litex Lovech from the A Group. The decision was taken in response to an incident that occurred during Litex Lovech's 12 December tie with Levski Sofia, when chairman Stoycho Stoilov controversially pulled the squad off the field in protest after two players were sent off with Lovech leading 1–0. On 20 January 2016 the team was administratively relegated to the B Group for the following 2016–17 season. Litex's players however were allowed to complete their participation in the Bulgarian Cup and finish the 2015–16 season with the club's reserve squad, Litex Lovech II, playing in the B Group.

On 27 May 2016, the company that represented PFC Chavdar Etropole, PFC Chavdar EAD, was renamed PFC CSKA-1948 AD. On 6 June 2016, the representative  of PFC Litex Lovech, PFC Litex-Lovech AD, was renamed PFC CSKA-Sofia EAD, with PFC CSKA-1948 AD being written in as its owner. That company later successfully applied to take part in the reformed First League, as PFC CSKA Sofia. The shift was made because the former company that represented PFC CSKA Sofia, PFC CSKA AD, did not gain a professional license, and later went bankrupt, ceasing operations as of 9 September 2016. PFC Litex Lovech was demoted to the Third League, taking the place of FC Botev Lukovit.

On 4 July 2016, former Litex player Zhivko Zhelev was appointed as a manager of a team that consisted mainly of academy players. Litex managed to win its first match of the new season. The squad also played in the 2016–17 Bulgarian Cup, eliminating First League outfits Slavia Sofia and Cherno More on their way to the semifinals, where Litex lost to reigning five-time champions Ludogorets Razgrad on an aggregate score of 0–11. Litex also was promoted to the Second League, after winning the North-West Group of the Third League.

League positions

Recent league statistics

Stadium

Litex Lovech's home ground is the Lovech Stadium, a football stadium in Lovech. Built in 1962, the ground underwent a total reconstruction in 1999 and was brought to a suitable standard to host international matches later that year. The stadium has a capacity of 8,000 seating places with pitch dimensions of 105 to 68 meters. The venue's record attendance of 12,500 was achieved during a domestic league match against Levski Sofia on 19 April 1998. The record attendance in the European club competitions was achieved against English club Aston Villa on 18 September 2008, when around 8,000 spectators supported the team.

In the summer of 2010, a massive reconstruction of the venue started. New side stands with roof covers were built and the media sectors were expanded in order to meet the UEFA guidelines for Champions League matches. On 12 July 2010, the stadium was awarded with a Category 3 ranking by UEFA. The reconstructions continued in the summer of 2011, when the main stand of the stadium was completed.

Honours

Domestic
First League:
Winners (4): 1997–98, 1998–99, 2009–10, 2010–11
Runners-up (1): 2001–02
Third place (3): 2002–03, 2005–06,  2013–14

Second League:
Winners (2): 1993–94, 1996–97

Third League:
Winners (2): 1973–74, 2016–17

Bulgarian Cup:
Winners (4): 2000–01, 2003–04, 2007–08, 2008–09
Runners-up (3): 1998–99, 2002–03, 2006–07

Bulgarian Supercup:
Winners (1): 2010
  Runners-up (5): 2004, 2007, 2008, 2009,  2011

European
UEFA Cup/UEFA Europa League:
Round of 32 (2): 2001–02, 2005–06

European record

Players

Current squad
As of 22 September 2022

For recent transfers, see Transfers summer 2022.

Notable players

Had international caps for their respective countries, or held any club record. Players whose name is listed in bold represented their countries.

Bulgaria
 Aleksandar Tsvetkov
 Angel Lyaskov
 Atanas Bornosuzov
 Dimcho Belyakov
 Dimitar Karadaliev
 Georgi Denev
 Georgi Milanov
 Hristo Yanev
 Hristo Yovov
 Ivaylo Petkov
 Ivelin Popov
 Kiril Despodov
 Kristiyan Malinov
 Mihail Venkov
 Momchil Tsvetanov
 Nikolay Dimitrov
 Petar Hubchev
 Petar Zanev
 Plamen Linkov
 Plamen Nikolov
 Radostin Kishishev
 Rosen Kirilov
 Simeon Slavchev
 Stanislav Manolev
 Stefan Kolev
 Stefan Yurukov
 Stoyan Stavrev
 Stoycho Stoilov
 Strahil Popov
 Svetoslav Todorov
 Tsvetomir Panov
 Vasil Bozhikov
 Vitomir Vutov
 Zdravko Zdravkov
 Zhivko Zhelev
 Tiago Silva
 Zlatomir Zagorčić
 Zoran Janković

Europe
 Alban Bushi
 Altin Haxhi
 Armando Vajushi
 Jurgen Gjasula
 Džemal Berberović
 Alexandre Barthe
 Jean-Philippe Caillet
 Wilfried Niflore
 Robert Popov
 Bjørn Maars Johnsen
 Bogdan Pătraşcu
 Eugen Trică
 Florin Prunea
 Laurențiu Reghecampf
 Igor Bogdanović
 Nebojša Jelenković
 Milivoje Novakovič

South America
 Sandrinho
 Doka Madureira
 Tom
  Danilo Moreno Asprilla
 Wilmar Jordán
 Alejandro Cichero

Africa
 Mourad Hdiouad

Managerial history

This is a list of the recent Litex Lovech managers:

Notable stats

Most goals for the club

First professional league top scorer with the club

Notes: Last update 16 May 2010

All-time top scorers in A PFG

Updated 13 December 2014

References

External links

Official websites
 Official website
 UEFA Profile
Supporters website
 Ultras website
Information and statistics
 Litex at worldfootball.net

 
Association football clubs established in 1921
Litex
1921 establishments in Bulgaria